Kolomensky (masculine), Kolomenskaya (feminine), or Kolomenskoye (neuter) is the name of several rural localities in Russia:
Kolomensky (rural locality), a settlement in Voznesenovskoye Rural Settlement of Talovsky District of Voronezh Oblast
Kolomenskoye, Tula Oblast, a village in Mikhaylovskaya Volost of Kurkinsky District of Tula Oblast
Kolomenskoye, Voronezh Oblast, a selo in Kondrashkinskoye Rural Settlement of Kashirsky District of Voronezh Oblast
Kolomenskaya, a sloboda in Ozerensky Rural Okrug of Venyovsky District of Tula Oblast